Ancient Symbols is a Unicode block containing Roman characters for currency, weights, and measures.

Block

History
The following Unicode-related documents record the purpose and process of defining specific characters in the Ancient Symbols block:

See also 
Greek script in Unicode

References 

Unicode blocks